King Anxi of Wei (died 243 BC), personal name Wei Yu was King of Wei from 276 BC to 243 BC. He was the son of King Zhao of Wei. He was the older brother of Lord Xinling (Wei Wuji). In 275 BC, after a Han general fled to the Wei capital Daliang, King Anxi began a war against Qin in an alliance with Qi. Qin forces under chancellor Wei Ran and general Bai Qi captured 4 cities, besieged Daliang and killed 40,000 people. In 273 BC, with the assistance of Lord Mengchang of Qi, he began another war in an alliance with Zhao. The war ended with the deaths of 130,000 people. In 257 BC, he assisted Zhao when its capital Handan was besieged by Qin forces, at the request of Lord Pingyuan of Zhao, who was married to Xinling's older sister.

References 

Monarchs of Wei (state)
LGBT royalty
Chinese LGBT people
Ancient LGBT people
LGBT heads of state
3rd-century BC Chinese monarchs